The 2010 elections for the Missouri House of Representatives were held on November 2, 2010, with all districts being contested. Necessary primary elections were held on August 3, 2010. The term of office for those elected in 2010 will run for two years, starting on January 4, 2011.

Make-up of the House following the 2010 elections

2010 General election

References

External links
 Results from Missouri Secretary of State

House
Missouri House of Representatives elections
Missouri House of Representatives